Pura Mani Manohar is a village in Tiloi block of Rae Bareli district, Uttar Pradesh, India. As of 2011, its population is 959, in 186 households. It has one primary school and no healthcare facilities.

The 1961 census recorded Pura Mani Manohar (here spelled "Pure Mani Manohar") as comprising 2 hamlets, with a total population of 351 people (180 male and 171 female), in 76 households and 71 physical houses. The area of the village was given as 346 acres.

The 1981 census recorded Pura Mani Manohar (here spelled "Pure Manimanohar") as having a population of 446 people, in 90 households, and having an area of 140.43 hectares.

References

Villages in Raebareli district